The Musalla complex, also known as the Musallah Complex or the Musalla of Gawhar Shah, is a former Islamic religious complex located in Herat, Afghanistan, containing examples of Timurid architecture. Much of the 15th-century complex is in ruins today, and the buildings that still stand are in need of restoration. The complex ruins consist of the five Musallah Minarets of Herat, the Mir Ali Sher Navai mausoleum, the Gawhar Shad Mausoleum, and the ruins of a large mosque and a madrasa complex. 

Construction on the complex began in 1417 under Queen Gawharshad, the wife of Timurid ruler Shah Rukh, and ended in the late 1400s with the building of a madrassa by Sultan Husayn Bayqara. It was seriously damaged in 1885 during the Panjdeh incident, when the British and ruling Emir of Afghanistan demolished most of the complex buildings. Due to earthquakes and war, four fell during the course of the 20th century.

History 
Shah Rukh made Herat the capital of the Timurid Empire in 1405, moving it from Samarkand. The complex was then commissioned by Timurid Queen Gawhar Shad and construction began in 1417, likely under architect Kavamad-Din of Shiraz who also built a similar madrasa in Khar Gerd. The complex had two minarets by its eastern façade on either side of the main entrance and the mausoleum in its northwest corner. The mosque was completed in 1437. A madrasa by Sultan Husayn Bayqara called Madrasa Ni'matiyya was built sometime between 1469 and 1506, probably around 1493 (898 AH).

The Musalla complex was heavily damaged in the late 19th century. Due to artillery fire, the minaret tops were destroyed in 1868.

Then during the Panjdeh incident of 1885, Russian soldiers attacked Afghan soldiers southeast of Merv. Most of the buildings in the complex were leveled by the British and Emir Abdur Rahman Khan in order to prevent the Russians from using the buildings as cover. Only the Gawhar Shad mausoleum and nine of the original twenty minarets were allowed to remain. The Heratis had petitioned Abdur Rahman to save the complex, but he responded that saving the living was more important than saving the dead's resting places. Ultimately the crisis was resolved, and fighting never broke out, making the destruction unnecessary. Nine minarets and two mausoleums were spared destruction.

An earthquake in 1932 destroyed two of the mosque's four minarets, and another earthquake in 1951 destroyed another, leaving only one standing. Only five of the original twenty minarets in the complex remained in 2021.

The complex was visited and photographed in the 1930s by the travel writers Robert Byron and Annemarie Schwarzenbach. Byron's book, The Road to Oxiana, mentions the minarets and discusses Timurid history. The mausoleum of 'Ali Shir Nawa'i was rebuilt in 1950.

Preservation efforts 
By the 20th century, the mausoleum had been extensively damaged, with the cupola in particular being severely deteriorated. Intervention in the 1950s supervised and led by Fikri Saljuqi resulted in drastically changing the appearance of the building, with construction of an entirely new eastern façade and a partly new southern facade, and the hexagonal Mihrab being demolished and replaced with a rectangular one. Restoration and repairs to the mausoleum often were of poor quality using inappropriate materials.

The United Nations Educational, Scientific and Cultural Organization (UNESCO) along with Italian architect Andrea Bruno began preliminary conservation and restoration efforts in 1974–75. Work started on the minarets of the Nicmatiyya madrassa in April 1977. A year later, structural reinforcement started in cooperation with the Democratic Republic of Afghanistan government. Its aim was to restore the faience decoration and to prevent masonry erosion. The work was slowed due to a lack of steel piping. While close to finishing the mosque restoration, Herat's March 1979 uprising and the resultant suppression caused work to end. UNESCO returned briefly in 1989 to review the situation.

During the Soviet–Afghan War, the mausoleum and minarets suffered additional damage. Herat was the only urban battlefield during the war, and historical buildings were often targeted to lower morale. The mausoleum's roof was struck in 1984–1985 and lost several tiles, especially on the northern and western portions. At the bottom of the dome, writing in Kufic was partially destroyed on the eastern side and completely gone on the north. The 1950 eastern façade was hit by a shell and repaired with regular bricks. Evidence of the former connections to the madrasa to the east and south was destroyed. Its inner square chamber remained in good condition. The last minaret that stood at the corners of the mosque was almost completely destroyed by Soviet heavy artillery during this period, leaving only  of its base remaining. The middle minaret also suffered damage, with tile work in the best condition on the southern side and partly remaining on the eastern side. The balcony supports were destroyed and shells hit the minaret. A  hole was created  up, exposing the staircase inside. A scar two meters below the hole was also created. Further repairs were conducted by the Danish Committee for Aid to Afghan Refugees (DACAAR) and the WFP between 1992 and 1994. DACAAR added masonry and covered the dome of the mausoleum along with the base with a thin layer of cement.

Emergency preservation work was carried out at the site in 2001 by the Society for the Preservation of Afghanistan's Cultural Heritage (SPACH). These efforts included erecting walls to protect the mausoleum and Sultan Husain Madrasa, restoring garden landscaping at the mausoleum, and measures to forestall the collapse of the Gawhar Shad Madrasa's remaining minaret. In 2014, UNESCO and the Afghanistan government coordinated to attempt to preserve and replicate the tile work on the exterior dome. UNESCO is presently considering the nomination of Herat as a World Heritage Site.

In 2020, the Aga Khan Development Network made a pledge to the President of Afghanistan to restore a minaret in danger of collapsing. This work is being completed through the work of the Aga Khan Trust for Culture.

Description 
The location was convenient because of its close vicinity to the royal residence in the Bagh-i Zaghan. In 2015, Herat's suburbs were surrounding the site. The complex was centered around a musalla . The inner court had four iwans, with two arcades going around it. The madrasa with the mausoleum in its corner was built to the northwest Mosque. Husayn Bayqara's madrassa was built to the northwest of Gawhar Shad's madrasa. There was also the mausoleum of Ali-Shir Nava'i  between the ruins of the madrasas. Across from the mausoleum of Gawhar Shad there was the tomb of Sheikh Zadeh Abdallah. Abdallah's tomb was octagonal with four iwans, with the north iwan being the largest.

Minarets
The complex used to have 20 minarets adorned with tiles in intricate patterns and designs. By 2002, the five remaining Musalla Minarets of Herat had their tiles scattered on the ground around them.

The minarets are each 55 meters tall, braced with steel cables. The current minarets in Herat are the remains of 20 minarets of the former complex.

Nine towers survived the events of 1885, but the explosions had weakened them structurally, and they remained neglected over the next few years due to an unsettled political situation. No repairs or restorations were undertaken, and over time, four more towers collapsed due to structural weaknesses, earthquake and sheer decrepitude. Only five of the original twenty minarets survive today.

The four eastern minarets stood at the corners of Sultan Husayn Bayqara's Ni'matiyya madrasa before it was demolished, and outlined a courtyard . They had one balcony each and were a brighter blue than the four minarets that stood in the west. Due to wind and changes in temperature, they all lean westward. The minarets had an ornate turquoise tile covering before it was destroyed. Robert Byron wrote it "was as if one saw the sky through a net of shining hair planted suddenly with flowers". There were also two tall arches over an entrance, depicted in 1887. The tombstone of Bayqara's grandfather, called the Stone of the Seven Pens, is nearby. 

The four minarets in the west stood at the corners of the former mosque and outlined a court . These were wider, eight-sided, and had one balcony each. They were supported by white marble panels and the color of grape-blue. Three fell due to earthquakes in the 20th century. The remaining minaret, called Minar-i Nahbas, stood in the southwest. Fakhr-ul Madaris, a religious school with 350 students, was built at its base around 1940, incorporating the minaret into its norther façade. Both minaret and school were destroyed by Soviet artillery in 1985, and only  of the minaret's base remains. 

The middle minaret with a height of  has two balconies and was decorated with blue lozenges separated by regular bricks with flower mosaics. The top of the minaret (above the second balcony) was hit by artillery and destroyed. The minaret was one of a pair that had stood at the sides of the entrance to the madrasa.

Gawhar Shad Mausoleum

The mausoleum was originally constructed to house the remains of Prince Baysunghur, a son of the Timurid ruler Shah Rukh and Gawhar Shad. Some members of Baysunghur's family were interred alongside him. They included Gawhar Shad herself and her brother Amir Sufi Tarkhan, her other son Muhammad Juki, Baysunghur's sons Sultan Muhammad and Ala al-Dawla, as well as the latter's son Ibrahim. More distantly related Timurids, Ahmad and Shah Rukh (sons of Abu Sa'id Mirza, who was responsible for Gawhar Shad's execution), were also buried in the mausoleum. Baysunghur's father Shah Rukh was briefly interred as well, before later being transferred to the Gur-e-Amir in Samarqand.

It lies is between the two western minarets and was built in the madrasa's northwest corner. The building forms a cruciform shape, with a dome covering the center. This dome is the most impressive feature of the structure, in that it is actually three domes superimposed over one another: a low inner dome, a bulbous outer cupola and a structural dome between them. The outer cupola is decorated with flowery light-blue-green mosaics. The inner dome is adorned with gold leaf, lapis lazuli and other colours which form intricate patterns. The interior of the tomb itself is a square chamber with axial niches. 

Due to the widespread habit of tombstones being taken and re-used, it is unknown how many burials there are in the mausoleum. Though some sources claim there were as many as twenty grave markers at one time, at present there are only six. Lying in the center of the room, they are oblong shaped and made of matt black stone, with floral patterns carved on them. There are two larger stones, three smaller cenotaphs, and a child-sized tomb.

In 1998, some objects were located inside the mausoleum to preserve them and prevent robbery. They include twelve  marble slabs, a piece of the base of a minaret rising from the mosque, a large slab with seven lines of writing, and other marble panels.

Gallery

See also
 Musalla Minarets of Herat
 Gawhar Shad Mausoleum
 Timurid Empire
 Minaret of Jam
 Ghazni Minarets

Notes

References

External links 
Timurid Herat by Terry Allen
The Timurid architecture of Iran and Turan

Herat
14th-century religious buildings and structures
Arts in Afghanistan
Archaeological sites in Afghanistan
Demolished buildings and structures in Afghanistan
Islam and other religions
Vandalized works of art
Destroyed sculptures
Buildings and structures demolished in 1885
Buildings and structures in Herat